The 33rd Massachusetts General Court, consisting of the Massachusetts Senate and the Massachusetts House of Representatives, met in 1812 and 1813 during the governorship of Caleb Strong. Samuel Dana served as president of the Senate and Timothy Bigelow served as speaker of the House.

Senators

Representatives

See also
 Gerrymandering in the United States
 12th United States Congress
 13th United States Congress
 List of Massachusetts General Courts

References

External links
 . (Includes data for state senate and house elections in 1812)
 
 
 
 

Political history of Massachusetts
Massachusetts legislative sessions
massachusetts
1812 in Massachusetts
massachusetts
1813 in Massachusetts